Summa Akron City Hospital, part of Summa Health System, was founded in 1892 in Akron, Ohio, United States as The City Hospital. From the first accredited radiology department in the country to the first adult open heart surgery in Akron (and one of the first in the country), Summa Akron City Hospital has achieved national recognition as a healthcare provider.

Summa Akron City Hospital is a Level I trauma center with 100 emergency/trauma patient care spaces, and is a nationally ranked 750-bed non-profit, teaching hospital located in Akron, Ohio. Summa Akron City Hospital is also a Certified Chest Pain Center and a Comprehensive Stroke Center, and its obstetrics care is nationally recognized for quality.

The hospital received national attention during the 2015 NBA Finals because both LeBron James and Stephen Curry were born there.

In 2010, Summa Akron City and St. Thomas Hospitals were awarded Magnet recognition by American Nurses Credentialing Center. Only six percent of hospitals in the United States are recognized as Magnet hospitals.

Major milestones
1973
 Becomes teaching hospital in consortium with what was then known as the Northeast Ohio Universities College of Medicine (NEOUCOM), (now the Northeast Ohio Medical University (NEOMED).

2008
 Jean and Milton Cooper Cancer Center opens on the campus of Summa Akron City Hospital.

2019
 The Akron Campus West Tower opens at the Summa Akron City Main Campus. It includes the new main entrance to the hospital, operating rooms,  a 22-bed neonatal intensive care unit, labor and delivery rooms, prep and recovery rooms, a newborn observation room, women's health services, breast center and 108 private inpatient rooms.

Recognition and honors
 Designated a Magnet Hospital.

Services
Summa Akron City Hospital is known for advancements in geriatric medicine, hospice and palliative care, women's health, bariatrics, oncology, orthopaedics and cardiology.

Its services also include: cardiothoracic surgery; critical care; diagnostic imaging; digestive diseases; gastroenterology; medical and surgical services; neonatal intensive care; neurology; obstetrics and gynecology; pain management; pediatric intensive care; pulmonary care; radiology; rehabilitation services; sleep disorders; occupational, physical, recreational and speech therapy; urology and vascular.

People born in this hospital
 Stephen Curry (b. March 14, 1988), American professional basketball player
 LeBron James (b. December 30, 1984), American professional basketball player
 Neel Kashkari (b. July 30, 1973), American banker and politician                                                                                                                       * Michael Booker (b. May 26, 1954), Scarletts Husband

References

External links

Hospitals in Ohio
Trauma centers